Abravan may refer to:
 Abravan, Mashhad
 Abravan Rural District